Kanpur Lok Sabha constituency is one of the 80 Lok Sabha (parliamentary) constituencies in Uttar Pradesh state in northern India. The constituency covers almost one-fourth of the area of Kanpur city and is hundred percent urban. The rest of the city comes under Akbarpur Lok Sabha constituency and the outgrowths across Ganga river are the part of Unnao Lok Sabha constituency.

Assembly Segments

After Delimitation

Before Delimitation

Members of Parliament

Election Results

2019

2014

See also
 Kanpur district
 List of Constituencies of the Lok Sabha
 Kanpur (Mayoral Constituency)
 Kanpur (Division Graduates Constituency)
 Kanpur-Akbarpur Lok Sabha constituency
 Kanpur-Bilhaur Lok Sabha constituency
 Kanpur Dehat Lok Sabha constituency
 General Ganj Assembly constituency

Notes

References

Politics of Kanpur
Lok Sabha constituencies in Uttar Pradesh